This article details the 2013 Durand Cup Quarter-Finals.

The group stage features 12 teams: the 10 automatic qualifiers and the 2 winners of the preliminary stage.

The teams are drawn into four groups of three, and play each once. The matchdays are between 9 September to 15 September.

The top teams in each group advanced to the Semi-Finals.

Group A

Group B

Group C

Group D

References

External links 
 https://web.archive.org/web/20130921145615/http://coverindialive.in/category/football/durand-cup/

Quarter-Finals